The  was a field army of the Imperial Japanese Army during World War II, based in southern Manchukuo and active in combat against the Soviet Union in the very final stages of the war.

History
The Japanese 3rd Area Army was formed on October 29, 1943 under the control of the Kwantung Army as a military reserve and garrison force to maintain security and public order in southern Manchukuo as many veteran divisions of the Kwantung Army were transferred to the various southern fronts in the Pacific War. It consisted mostly of minimally-trained reservists, conscripted students and home guard militia, without adequate weapons or supplies. The 3rd Area Army was headquartered in Mukden.

The units of the 3rd Area Army proved to be no match for the Red Army when the Soviet Union invaded Manchukuo towards the end of World War II. General Jun Ushiroku refused orders from Kwantung Army Headquarters to retreat, and launched a counterattack along the Mukden–Port Arthur railway, along which many Japanese civilians were fleeing. However, General Uchiroku was hampered by lack of armor and by insufficient ammunition, and by August 13, 1945, his formations were largely shattered. A mutiny by the Manchukuo Imperial Army at Shinkyō ended his attempts to regroup. Many surviving soldiers of the 3rd Area Army, including General Ushiroku, became prisoners in Siberia and other parts of the Soviet Union after the surrender of Japan on August 15, 1945.

List of Commanders

Commanding officer

Chief of Staff

References

Books

External links

Notes 

3
Military units and formations established in 1943
Military units and formations disestablished in 1945